"Crawl" is the first commercially available single by New Zealand rock band Atlas, released in 2007 from their debut album, Reasons for Voyaging. It stayed atop New Zealand's RIANZ Singles Chart for seven weeks and was certified gold for selling over 5,000 copies in New Zealand. A music video directed by Olly Langridge was created for the song. In a 2009 interview with New Zealand news media site Stuff, vocalist Sean Cunningham said, "Believe it or not, when we were writing 'Crawl' we didn't know it was a catchy song."

Music video
A music video directed by Ollie Langridge was made for the song. In the video, a group of people, including Atlas vocalists Sean Cunningham and Beth Campbell, suddenly collapse. As Cunningham and Campbell sing the song, they slowly crawl past all the people, who appear to be incapacitated by a forcefield. Toward the end of the video, the anomaly suddenly disappears, allowing everyone to stand and move again. The video ends when two mysterious men exit a car. New Zealand film and television website NZ on Screen compared the video to The Twilight Zone, referring to it as "moody".

Track listing
New Zealand CD single
 "Crawl"
 "Is This Real"
 "Crawl" (video)
 "Is This Real" (video)

Credits and personnel
Credits are lifted from the New Zealand CD single liner notes.

Studios
 Recorded and mixed at Roundhead Studios (Auckland, New Zealand)
 Mastered at Sterling Sound (New York City)

Personnel
 Atlas – writing
 Ben Campbell – production
 Hank Lindermann – production
 Neil Baldock – mixing, engineering
 George Marino – mastering
 Sam Nixon – photography

Charts

Weekly charts

Year-end charts

Certifications

References

2007 singles
2007 songs
Atlas (band) songs
Number-one singles in New Zealand